Al Sabaah (in Arabic الصباح meaning The Morning) is the official newspaper of Iraq. It was founded after the fall of Saddam Hussein's regime in 2003.

See also
 List of newspapers in Iraq
 Media of Iraq

External links
 Al Sabaah Newspaper in Arabic

2003 establishments in Iraq
Arabic-language newspapers
Publications established in 2003
Mass media in Baghdad
Newspapers published in Iraq